Naf Tourism Park is a proposed economic zone in the Jaliardip, Cox's Bazar and will be the first exclusive tourism park in Bangladesh. BEZA is developing this as part of its plan to develop 100 special economic zones throughout the country.

History 
The Cabinet Committee on Economic Affairs approved the project on 6 May 2015. Bangladesh Economic Zones Authority (BEZA) has planned to develop a new tourism park in Sabrang in Teknaf. But the government faced major challenges like lack of infrastructure such as water and power supplies and water treatment systems and the rehabilitation of farmers. Cox's Bazar is also prone to storms. The Sabrang site is vulnerable to flood and storm surges. The developer or authorities will have to bear high expenses for embankments and landfills.

Location 
Naf Tourism Park will be located in the Jaliardwip island which is situated in the middle of the Naf river that divides Myanmar and Bangladesh. The island is diverse and multifaceted as it has both hill and river view.

Construction 
The Department of Environment (DoE) has provided environmental clearance for the development of the Tourism Park. A feasibility study was carried out by the UNICONSULT- a German based consultancy firm, Environmental Impact Assessment (EIA) and Socio-economic Impact Assessment (SIA) was done by PricewaterhouseCoopers, India. The government has asked for bid for building various infrastructure for the tourists.

Prime Minister Sheikh Hasina laid the foundation stone of the project on 6 May 2017.

On 12 September 2018 Siam Siam International of Thailand signed an agreement with Bangladesh Economic Zones Authority (BEZA) to invest around $500 million for the infrastructure development. The development of the park will be done in  phases in the next five years.

Objections to the location 
A  group of environmentalists, opposes the project citing its status as a sanctuary of many animals. The soil level of this island also often remains submerged.

References 

Economy of Chittagong Division
Special economic zones of Bangladesh